Circling In is a double LP collection by jazz pianist Chick Corea featuring performances recorded between 1968 and 1970, including the first recordings by the group Circle, which was first released on the Blue Note label in 1975. It contains trio performances by Corea with Miroslav Vitouš and Roy Haynes recorded in March 1968, which were later added to the CD reissue of Now He Sings, Now He Sobs as bonus tracks, and performances by permutations of the band Circle recorded in April and July 1970 some of which were later released as Early Circle.

Reception 
The Allmusic review by Scott Yanow awarded the album 4½ stars stating it "gives one a clear picture into the evolution of pianist Chick Corea during the 1968-70 period".

Track listing 
All compositions by Chick Corea except where noted.

Side One
 "Bossa" - 4:45  
 "Gemini" - 4:17  
 "My One and Only Love" (Guy Wood, Robert Mellin) - 3:33  
 "Fragments" - 4:01  
 "Windows" - 3:08 
Side Two
 "Samba Yanta" - 2:38  
 "I Don't Know" - 2:38  
 "Pannonica" (Thelonious Monk) - 2:58  
 "Blues Connotation" - 7:17  
 "Duet for Bass and Piano No.1" (Chick Corea, Dave Holland) - 3:28  
 "Duet for Bass and Piano No.2" (Corea, Holland) - 1:40
Side Three
 "Danse for Clarinet and Piano No.1" (Corea, Anthony Braxton) - 2:14  
 "Danse for Clarinet and Piano No.2" (Corea, Braxton) - 2:32  
 "Chimes Part 1" (Corea, Braxton, Holland) - 10:20  
 "Chimes Part 2" (Corea, Braxton, Holland) - 6:40 
Side Four
 "Starp" (Holland) - 5:20  
 "73º - A Kelvin" (Braxton) - 9:09  
 "Ballad" (Barry Altschul, Braxton, Corea, Holland) - 6:41
Recorded at A&R Studios in New York City on March 14, 1968 (Side One, tracks 1 & 3),  March 19, 1968 (Side One, tracks 2 & 4), March 27, 1968 (Side One, track 5 and Side Two, tracks 1-3), April 7, 1970 (Side Two, track 4), August 13, 1970 (Side Two, tracks 5 & 6 and Side Three), and August 19, 1970 (Side Four).

Personnel 
 Chick Corea – piano, celeste, vibes, percussion 
 Anthony Braxton – alto saxophone, soprano saxophone, flute, clarinet, contrabass clarinet, percussion (Side Three and Side Four)
 Miroslav Vitouš (Side One and Side Two, tracks 1-3) – bass
 Dave Holland (Side Two, tracks 4-6, Side Three and Side Four) – bass, cello, guitar  
 Roy Haynes – drums (Side One and Side Two, tracks 1-3)
 Barry Altschul – drums, percussion (Side Two, tracks 4-6 and Side Four)

See also 
 Chick Corea discography

References 

1975 albums
Blue Note Records albums
Chick Corea albums
Circle (jazz band) albums